Kenya is a multilingual country. Swahili, a Bantu language, and English are widely spoken as lingua francas and serve as the two official languages. English was inherited from colonial rule (see British Kenya). Including second-language speakers, there are more speakers of Swahili than English in Kenya.

Overview

According to Ethnologue, there are a total of 68 languages spoken in Kenya. This variety is a reflection of the country's diverse population that includes most major ethnoracial and linguistic groups found in Africa (see Languages of Africa). 

Languages spoken locally belong to three broad language families: Niger-Congo (Bantu branch) and Nilo-Saharan (Nilotic branch), spoken by the country's Bantu, Nilotic populations and the  Cushitic, Afroasiatic language family respectively. The Arab ethnic minority speak languages belonging to the separate Afroasiatic family, with the Hindustani and British residents speaking languages from the Indo-European family.

Kenya's various ethnic groups typically speak their mother tongues within their own communities. The two official languages, English and Swahili, are used in varying degrees of fluency for communication with other populations.

British English is primarily used in Kenya. Additionally, a distinct local dialect, Kenyan English, is used by some communities and individuals in the country, and contains features unique to it that were derived from local Bantu languages such as Kiswahili and Kikuyu. It has been developing since colonisation and also contains certain elements of American English. English is widely spoken in commerce, schooling and government. Peri-urban and rural dwellers are less multilingual, with many in rural areas speaking only their native languages.

Language families

Major languages

The 2019 census reports the largest communities of native speakers in Kenya as follows:

Bantu
Kikuyu 8.1 million
Kamba 4.7 million
Luhya 3.3 million
(incl. Bukusu 1.2 million)
Gusii 2.7 million
Meru 2.0 million
Mijikenda/Giriama ca. 1 million
Nilotic
Dholuo 5.0 million
Kalenjin languages 4.6 million
(Kipsigis 1.9 million, Nandi 940,000)
Maasai  1.2 (1.9 million including Tanzania)
Turkana 1.0 million
Cushitic
 Oromo (over 48 million incl. Ethiopia)
 Borana, 3.4 million speakers in 2010
 Orma, 659,000 speakers in 2015
Somali 2.8 million (22 million incl. Ethiopia and Somalia)

Minor languages
Languages spoken by the country's ethnic minorities include:

Afroasiatic languages
Cushitic
Rendille, 60,000 speakers in 2015
Semitic
Arabic
Indo-European
Hindustani
English
Bantu
Swahili

References

External links
Linguistic map of Kenya at Muturzikin.com
Ethnologue page for Kenya
National Public Radio story about Kisii language from All Things Considered program, April 29, 2006
PanAfriL10n page on Kenya

 
Kenya